The following lists events in 1910 in Iceland.

Incumbents
 Monarch: Frederick VIII
Prime Minister – Björn Jónsson

Events
December – The newspaper Vísir is founded.

Births
20 July – Þórunn Elfa Magnúsdóttir, writer (d. 1995).
9 November – Bragi Sigurjónsson, politician (d. 1995).
29 December – Gunnar Thoroddsen, politician (d. 1983)

Deaths
9 February – Páll Melsteð, historian, official, editor and member of the Althing (b. 1812).

References

 
Iceland
Iceland
Years of the 20th century in Iceland